Henry Arthur Brassey (14 July 1840 – 13 May 1891), DL, of Preston Hall, Aylesford, Kent and of  Bath House, Piccadilly, London, was a British Member of Parliament.

Origins
He was the second son of the railway magnate Thomas Brassey (1805-1870) by his wife Maria Harrison, a daughter of Thomas Harrison of Liverpool. His elder brother was Thomas Brassey, 1st Earl Brassey and his younger brother was Albert Brassey, a Member of Parliament for Banbury.

Career
He was educated at Oxford University, and in 1868 was elected as Member of Parliament for Sandwich in Kent, as a Liberal, a seat he held until 1885. Brassey served as a Deputy Lieutenant for Kent, as High Sheriff of Kent in 1890 and as a Justice of the Peace for that county.

Marriage and children
In 1866 Brassey married Anna Harriet Stevenson (d.1898), a daughter of Major George Robert Stevenson of Tongswood, Hawkhurst, Kent, by whom he had five sons and seven daughters, including:
Henry Brassey, 1st Baron Brassey of Apethorpe, second but eldest surviving son and heir, a Conservative politician who was raised to the peerage in 1938. 
Harold Ernest Brassey, soldier and polo champion;
Hilda Brassey (Duchess of Richmond), wife of Charles Gordon-Lennox, 8th Duke of Richmond.

Death
Brassey died in May 1891, aged 50.

References

External links 
 

1840 births
1891 deaths
Henry Brassey
Liberal Party (UK) MPs for English constituencies
UK MPs 1868–1874
UK MPs 1874–1880
UK MPs 1880–1885
Deputy Lieutenants of Kent
High Sheriffs of Kent